Nogai (Ногай тили, Nogay tili,  Ногайша, Nogayşa) also known as Noğay, Noghay, Nogay, or Nogai Tatar, is a Turkic language spoken in Southeastern European Russia, Kazakhstan, Uzbekistan, Ukraine, Bulgaria, Romania and in Turkey. It is the ancestral language of the Nogais. As a member of the Kipchak branch, it is closely related to Kazakh, Karakalpak and Crimean Tatar (northern dialect). In 2014 the first Nogai novel (Akşa Nenem) was published, written in the Latin alphabet.

Classification 
Nogai is generally classified into the Kipchak–Nogai branch of Kipchak Turkic. The latter also includes Siberian Tatar in Russia, Kazakh in Kazakhstan and Karakalpak in Uzbekistan.

Three distinct dialects are recognized: 
 Karanogay or Qara-Nogai (literally "Black Nogai"; "Northern Nogai"), spoken in Dagestan and Chechnya.
 Central Nogai or Nogai Proper, in Stavropol.
 Aqnogai (White or Western Nogai), by the Kuban River, its tributaries in Karachay–Cherkessia and in the Mineralnye Vody District. Qara-Nogai and Nogai Proper are very close linguistically, whereas Aqnogai is more different. However, all three are mutually intelligible.
 Nogais in Bulgaria, Romania and Turkey has Ottoman Turkish influences.

The outlying Yurt and Alabugat dialects, or Nogai Tatars, is divergent due to Tatar influence.

Karagash, Yurt and Utar are three more varieties sometimes classified as Nogai dialects but the Institute of Linguistics of the Russian Academy of Sciences recognizes them as separate languages.

History
The Nogais, descended from the peoples of the Golden Horde, take their name and that of their language from the grandson of Genghis Khan, Nogai Khan, who ruled the nomadic people west of the Danube toward the end of the 13th century. They then settled along the Black Sea coast of present-day Ukraine.

Originally, the Nogai alphabet was based on the Arabic script. In 1928, a Latin alphabet was introduced. It was devised by the Nogai academic  (Djanibek), following principles adopted for all Turkic languages.

In 1938, a transition to the Cyrillic alphabet began. The orthography based on the Latin alphabet was alleged to be an impediment to learning Russian.

The expulsion of the Nogais from Ukraine in the nineteenth century separated Nogai speakers into several geographically isolated groups. Some went to Turkey and Romania, while others stayed within the Russian Empire, settling in northern Dagestan and neighbouring areas of Chechnya and Stavropol Kray.

The Nogai language has disappeared very rapidly in Turkey. Today it is mostly spoken by the older generation, however there are still younger speakers, as there are some villages in Turkey where it is a common mode of communication. In the Soviet Union the language of instruction in schools was Russian, and the number of speakers declined there also. Recent estimates place the total number of Nogai speakers at about 80,000.

In 1973, two small Nogai-language newspapers were being published, one in Karachay–Cherkessia and another in the Dagestan Autonomous SSR (Ленин йолы), but most speakers never heard of these publications, and the papers did not reach Nogai villages.

Nogai is now part of the school curriculum from the 1st to the 10th year in the Nogai District of Dagestan. It is also taught at the Karachayevo-Cherkess Pedagogical School and the national branch of the Pedagogical Institute.

Phonology 

Phonemes in parentheses indicate copied lexical sounds.

Alphabet

There are 3 stages in the history of Nogai writing:
 before 1928 — writing based on the Arabic script
 1928—1938 — writing based on the Latin alphabet
 from 1938 — writing based on the Cyrillic alphabet

The Nogai alphabet based on Cyrillic was created in 1938. It included all of the Russian alphabet letters except Ё ё, and also the digraphs Гъ гъ, Къ къ, Нъ нъ. The digraphs Оь оь, Уь уь were added in the same year. In 1944 the digraphs Гъ гъ, Къ къ were excluded from the alphabet.

The last reform of the Nogai writing took place in 1960, when, as a result of discussions at the Karachay-Cherkessia Research Institute, Language and Literature, the letters Аь аь and Ё ё were added to it. After that, the Nogai alphabet took its present form.

Modern Nogai alphabet:

In Dobruja 

In Dobruja the Democratic Union of Tatar Turkish Muslims of Romania (UDTTMR) has an official latin alphabet which is used by Tatars of Romania (Nogais and Crimean Tatars). The Nogai component of the Tatar population are not separately enumerated in Romanian censuses. There are also books printed with that alphabet, some of them are „ALFABE“ and „Tatarşa oqıma kitabı“. The alphabet includes this letters:

References

External links 

 The Red Book of the Peoples of the Russian Empire

Agglutinative languages
Kipchak languages
Languages of Kazakhstan
Languages of Russia
Languages of Uzbekistan
Dagestan
Karachay-Cherkessia
Turkic languages